Lizzie Brocheré (born 22 March 1985) is a French film, television, and theatre actress who began working as a child actress in 1995. She moved to English-speaking roles in the early 2010s, with appearances in dark comedic and dramatic pieces from Jean-Marc Barr (One to Another, with Arthur Dupont and Karl E. Landler), Eric Schaeffer (After Fall, Winter, 2011) and Brad Falchuk and Ryan Murphy (American Horror Story: Asylum, 2012–2013, in which she played Grace Bertrand).

Life and career
Lizzie Brocheré is a French writer, actress, producer and activist. She starred as the lead in Gale Anne Hurd's sci-fi show Falling Water (2016–2018).

She is well known to US audiences for playing the role of Coco in Guillermo del Toro's The Strain and the role of Grace in FX's American Horror Story. Her international TV credits include the French TV series Versailles, BBC's The Hour and Canal+'s Braquo.

Brocheré began acting at a very young age and starred in various French TV shows and films including Hugo Santiago's The Wolf of the West Coast and Bac +70, for which she won the Best Young Actress Award at the Luchon Film Festival. Her big break came when she landed the lead role in the sensual Dogme 95 film One to Another directed by Jean-Marc Barr and Pascal Arnold with whom she collaborated again a few years later on with the thriller American Translation.

She was in the experimental video Linear by Anton Corbijn and also starred in Lou Viger's Do Me Love, which was one of the first features to be shot with a camera. She also starred in the VR film Alteration, which premiered at the 2017 Tribeca and Venice Film Festivals.

Her other film credits include: Nicolas Bedos's "The Good Times"; F. Javier Gutiérrez's Rings; David Verbeke's Full Contact, for which she won the award for Best Female Actor at the Chicago International Film Festival; Eric Schaeffer's After Fall, Winter; Frédéric Jardin's Nuit Blanche; Nakache and Toledano's Tellement proches'''s and Karin Albou's The Wedding Song, for which she won the Best Actress Award at the Saint-Jean-de-Luz Film Festival.

Brocheré received her master's in film and literature at the Sorbonne and went on to ESCP Europe business school for media management. During her time there, she worked for Acajou Films and launched the "7 Days for a Film" script contest in Cameroon. She also line-produced the winning short film Les Oreilles by Gilbert Babena.

She started the non-profit organisation Iemanja with Léo Leibovici, whose goal is to promote sustainable environmental awareness and create dialogues between cultures and generations. Through Iemanja, she produced the short environmental documentary Une Zone Humide à Défendre and Terre Ferme'', a collective work, written and directed with refugees, to explore the issue of "everyday racism" in the month leading up to the 2017 French presidential election. Iemanja also works to apply tools of performance to social integration techniques.

Filmography

Film

Television

Music videos

References

Further reading
  2012 Evylyn Crowley article in Vogue    
  2012 Brian Marder article at Hollywood.com

External links
 

1985 births
Living people
20th-century French actresses
21st-century French actresses
Actresses from Paris
French film actresses
French stage actresses
French television actresses
French child actresses